Kolvitsa is a village (selo) in the administrative jurisdiction of the town of Kandalaksha in Murmansk Oblast, Russia.  The village is located beyond the Arctic circle, on the Kolvitsa river near its confluence with Kolvitskaya Bay of Kandalaksha Gulf, White Sea.

Municipally, the village is a part of Kandalaksha Urban Settlement in Kandalaksha Municipal District.

The first written mention of Kolvitsa dates back to 1563, when Mitrofan Kukin, a resident of Kandalaksha, donated his lands (including Kolvitsa) to Kandalaksha Monastery.

References

Kandalaksha.org.  Information about Kolvitsa 

Rural localities in Murmansk Oblast
Kandalakshsky District